North Tuddenham is a civil parish in the English county of Norfolk, North Tuddenham is  east of East Dereham, and is close to the A47 road.

The parish church is dedicated to St Mary.

The villages name means 'Tuda's homestead/village'.

For the purposes of local government, it falls within the Upper Wensum Ward of Breckland District Council and the Elmham and Mattishall Division of Norfolk County Council.

RAF Tuddenham is nearby: in 1944, a USAF B24 bomber plane on a training mission crashed at North Tuddenham, killing the eight crew members. A memorial plaque is in St Mary's church.   The incident is also commemorated in a village flag, designed by a local school student, Esme Okan, in 2021.

References

http://kepn.nottingham.ac.uk/map/place/Norfolk/North%20Tuddenham

External links

GENUKI(tm) page

Breckland District
Villages in Norfolk
Civil parishes in Norfolk